Edward Edwards was a Welsh Anglican priest in the late 18th and early 19th centuries. He was archdeacon of Brecon from 1763 until 1805.

References

Archdeacons of Brecon
18th-century Welsh Anglican priests
19th-century Welsh Anglican priests
People from Brecknockshire